The Hope Webbing Company Mill is a historic textile mill at 999-1005 Main Street in Pawtucket, Rhode Island. The three brick buildings on this  are the surviving elements of what was once a larger complex, extending across Esten Avenue. The oldest portion of the main mill and the boiler house were built in 1889, with the mill growing by numerous additions through 1914. The preparing building was built in 1902 and enlarged in 1913. The company occupied all or part of the premises until 1994, when it moved its remaining production to Cumberland.

The mill was listed on the National Register of Historic Places in 2006.

See also
National Register of Historic Places listings in Pawtucket, Rhode Island

References

Industrial buildings completed in 1889
Industrial buildings and structures on the National Register of Historic Places in Rhode Island
Buildings and structures in Pawtucket, Rhode Island
National Register of Historic Places in Pawtucket, Rhode Island